Fred Klaus (born 27 February 1967) is a German former professional footballer who played as a forward. His son Felix Klaus is also a footballer.

References

Living people
1967 births
Association football forwards
German footballers
Bundesliga players
2. Bundesliga players
Championnat National 3 players
1. FC Nürnberg players
FC St. Pauli players
Hamburger SV players
Hertha BSC players
VfL Osnabrück players
SC Preußen Münster players
SG Quelle Fürth players